The U.S. Post Office and Courthouse in Eau Claire, Wisconsin was built in 1907.  It was listed on the National Register of Historic Places in 1991.  It is designed in Classical Revival architecture style.  Also known as Federal Building and U.S. Courthouse, it served historically as a courthouse and as a post office.

References

Further reading
 Guregian's paper in the references above gives architectural and historic details.

Federal buildings in the United States
Government buildings completed in 1907
Buildings and structures in Eau Claire, Wisconsin
Former federal courthouses in the United States
Post office buildings on the National Register of Historic Places in Wisconsin
Courthouses on the National Register of Historic Places in Wisconsin
Neoclassical architecture in Wisconsin
National Register of Historic Places in Eau Claire County, Wisconsin